Wheelers Hill is a suburb in Melbourne, Victoria, Australia, 22 km south-east of Melbourne's Central Business District, located within the City of Monash local government area.

At 152m above sea level it includes one of the highest points in metropolitan Melbourne.

History

Wheelers Hill was almost certainly named after James Wheeler, who was an early settler in the Dandenong area. James came out from Kilbride townland, Cavan, Ireland. James married Ellen Reilly née Glynn in 1848 after the death of her husband, Bernard. There was a five-room house on a creek that went down to the Dandenong Creek not far down the road from the Post Office. James had a disagreement with Joseph Jell about the cutting of trees which led to the lands being surveyed. James sold the land in 1854 and moved to Woodend.

The Wheelers Hill Hotel was a post office and stopping point for farmers before a 6 to 8-hour drive to the city by horse to sell their goods. The Wheelers Mansion was destroyed by a fire in the late 1920s. The house was located somewhere to the south of the Wheelers Hill Library. The Post Office opened on 1 January 1869 but was called Mulgrave until 1888.

Wheelers Hill was the last suburb of the now Monash City Council to be linked up to the electricity grid. This is because, at the time, there was a dispute between the Shire of Mulgrave and the Council of Waverley on whose suburb it was. The main roads in Wheelers Hill were named after landowners and run along the boundaries of old orchards and farms.

In Columbia Park on Jells Road, there are steps and a brick outline indicating where "Bellenden" homestead once stood. This was a solid brick home reportedly built for W.D. Robertson, a retired Melbourne baker. It had a tower which gave a commanding view of the Dandenong Ranges. During World War II, the building was in use as a home for children with infantile paralysis, then known as "spastic" babies. When the mothers were needed to work on the farms left idle by the men who had gone to war, their special-needs babies were cared for at Columbia Park. The house was occupied by a family named Jungwirth post-war and was in ruins by the time V.F.L Park was built nearby.

Today

Wheelers Hill is home to Jells Park, a major recreational facility of over 127 hectares. It contains 9 km of cycle paths and walking tracks which surround a large lake. Wheelers Hill is known for its trees. Parklands make up 31% of the total area of Wheelers Hill.

Secondary Schools
 Wheelers Hill Secondary College 
 Brentwood Secondary College 
Primary Schools
 Wheelers Hill Primary School
 Jells Park Primary School
 Waverley Meadows Primary School
 St. Justin's Parish School
 Brandon Park Primary School
 Good Shepherd Parish School
Private Schools
 Caulfield Grammar School

Sports Clubs

 Notting Hill/Brandon Park Cricket Club is the suburb's leading cricket team.
 Tennis players play at the Wheelers Hill Tennis Club on Sunnybrook Drive.

 Golfers play at the course of the Glen Waverley Golf Club at Waverley Road.

Public Library and Art Gallery

The Monash Gallery of Art  and the Wheelers Hill branch of the Monash Public Library Service  are co-located in a fine building at the corner of Jells Road and Ferntree Gully Road, Wheelers Hill. The architect of the original 1990 Gallery was Harry Seidler. Even though Seidler had designed a further whole cultural precinct beyond the gallery, Seidler's designs for a complete cultural centre were never implemented. Later architects Cox Sanderson Ness designed the adjoining library which has a bay of windows facing a small lake. The Gallery contains a nationally significant collection of Australian photography, of which its permanent collection comprises over 1500 works illustrating the development and evolution of the photographic medium in Australia.

Transport

There are nine bus services that run in or through the vicinity of Wheelers Hill. Two SmartBus services run through the boundaries of the suburb.

Notable people
 Chris Cheney, guitarist and lead vocalist from The Living End went to school in Wheelers Hill, attending the Wheelers Hill Secondary College.

See also
 City of Waverley – Wheelers Hill was previously within this former local government area.

References

Suburbs of Melbourne
Suburbs of the City of Monash